Alysia May and Nana Miyagi were the defending champions, but May opted to rest after competing at Manhattan Beach the previous week. Miyagi teamed up with Yayuk Basuki and the pair was forced to retire during their first round match against Wiltrud Probst and Marianne Werdel.

Rachel McQuillan and Claudia Porwik won the title by defeating Nicole Arendt and Shannan McCarthy 6–2, 6–4 in the final.

Seeds

Draw

Draw

References

External links
 Official results archive (ITF)
 Official results archive (WTA)

Women's Doubles
Doubles